This article lists examples of the ongoing influence on popular culture of the 1992 Los Angeles riots.

Film
(Chronological, then alphabetical by title)
 In the film Terminator 2: Judgment Day (1991), the scene at a biker bar was filmed on the exact night, March 3, that Rodney King was beaten, and exactly across the street. In the part where the Terminator is about to ride off on a motorcycle, the beating can briefly be seen through a window if looked at close enough.
 Spike Lee's film Malcolm X (1992) opens with a scene of the Rodney King beating, juxtaposed with a burning American flag that burns down and forms the letter X.
 The documentary film Post No Bills (1992) follows a political poster that was made of LAPD Chief Daryl Gates on an NRA shooting target and glued up on the streets of Los Angeles after the Rodney King beating. Post No Bills also includes an interview with Chief Gates about the poster and documents some of the events surrounding the resignation of Chief Gates from his position as Chief of Police.
 A political poster that was made of LAPD Chief Daryl Gates on an NRA shooting target and glued up on the streets of Los Angeles after the Rodney King beating was featured in several films, including Menace II Society (1993) and Robert Altman's The Player (1992).
 Dai Sil Kim-Gibson's documentary film, Sa-I-Gu (1993), tells the story of Korean women shopkeepers during the LA Civil Unrest.
 The film Floundering (1994) explores the alienation and disaffection the main character sees in his neighborhood of post-riot Venice Beach.
 The Brian Springer documentary Spin (1995) uses intercepted raw satellite feeds from commercial television to chronicle 1992 with significant attention to the riots and their treatment by the media, as well as urban conditions more generally.
 The film Riot (1997) looks at the riots and their effect on the lives of four families: one Chinese, one Hispanic, one White, and one Black.
 In the film American History X (1998), characters argue about the circumstances of Rodney King's arrest.
 In the film BASEketball (1998), Los Angeles' team is named after the riots.
 In the film Black Knight (2001), the character played by Martin Lawrence is sent back to medieval times and tells people he hails from Florence and Normandy. Toward the end of the movie, he gives a "Braveheart"- esque speech that mocks Rodney King.
 The final act of Dark Blue (2002) is set during the riots, reenacts several portions of it, as well as shows news footage of the attack on Reginald Denny.
 In the film National Security (2003), Steve Zahn's character tries to arrest Martin Lawrence's character, but a bumblebee flies at Lawrence and Zahn tries to beat it with a baton, resulting in a scene that looks like police brutality. A man tapes the incident and L.A., fearing another Rodney King incident, forces Zahn to resign. The all-black jury gives him a 6-month prison sentence.
 Dai Sil Kim-Gibson's film, Wet Sand: Voices from LA (2004), criticizes mainstream media for pitting Korean Americans against African Americans in the days preceding the LA Civil Unrest.
 The film Rize (2005) is a documentary of life in Watts, Los Angeles. It features footage and discussion of the Watts riots and discussed the deaths of many gang members and African American citizens.
 The film The L.A. Riot Spectacular (2006), narrated by Snoop Dogg and starring Emilio Estevez, Charles S. Dutton, and George Hamilton, takes a satirical look at the riots.
 The film Freedom Writers (2007) stars Hilary Swank as a school teacher in a Long Beach high school two years after the riots. The film opens with scenes of the riots and is set two years afterward, in 1994.
 Writer/Producer John Ridley and director Spike Lee are attached to a proposed Imagine Entertainment film based on the L.A. Riots.
 The film Straight Outta Compton (2015) shows footage from the L.A. riots, which are also discussed.
 The documentary film Let It Fall: Los Angeles 1982–1992 (2017), directed by John Ridley, is about the 10-year period leading up to, and including, the L.A. Riots. Its release coincided with the 25th anniversary of the unrest.
 Gook is a 2017 American drama film written and directed by Justin Chon that tells the story of two Korean-American brothers and their unlikely friendship with a neighborhood 11 year-old black girl, during the first day of the 1992 Los Angeles riots. 
 The documentary film LA 92 chronicles the event on its 25th anniversary.

Literature
(Alphabetical by author)
 In Steven Barnes' novel Blood Brothers (1996), much of the plot centers around an attempt to use the riots to cover up occult activity.
Paul Beatty's novel The White Boy Shuffle features the main character's involvement in the riots, including an argument on the way to loot a computer store over the "merits of an IBM-compatible versus an Apple."
The climax of Sylvia Brownrigg's novel, The Metaphysical Touch, involves the two main characters, previously only connected by email correspondence, making their way to Los Angeles just as the riots begin. The violence of the riots ends up severely impacting both of their lives.
Eve Bunting and David Díaz's Smoky Night is a children's picture book about two neighboring families who lived through the riots, and learn to accept each other despite their ethnicity.
 Another Michael Connelly novel, The Concrete Blonde takes place in the aftermath of the Riots, with a body being discovered buried under a storage locker that had been burnt down during the Riots.
In Michael Connelly's novel Echo Park, the detective Harry Bosch is trying to solve a cold case of a serial killer whose killings began during the 1992 riots. The book refers to a pawn shop that was set on fire during the riots, killing the owner. 
The Len Deighton novel Violent Ward (1993) is a detective mystery, in the Raymond Chandler vein, set against the background of the 1992 riots.
 The novel All Involved (2016) by Ryan Gattis involves mainly fictional gang members who use the chaos to viciously settle old scores.
 In The Freedom Writers Diary (1999) by Erin Gruwell, the L.A. Riots had a staggering effect on the diarists.
In Michael Moore's book Downsize This! Random Threats from an Unarmed American, he jokingly proposes a "commemorative riot" to mark the fifth anniversary of the original riots. Maintaining the ironic tone, Moore says that the rioters should target Beverly Hills, alerting the residents in advance to prevent anyone from getting hurt.
 Héctor Tobar's novel The Tattooed Soldier (1998) concludes during the riots, which are seen as mirroring the violence and breakdown of civil order that the novel's main characters had experienced in Guatemala before emigrating.

Music
(Alphabetical by artist)
2 Chainz's song "Riot" begins by talking about April 29, 1992.
2Pac's song "Hellrazor" is dedicated to Latasha Harlins -- "Little girl like LaTasha, had to die, She never got to see the bullet, just heard the shot, Her little body couldn't take it, it shook and dropped, And when I saw it on the news I see busta girl killin 'Tasha.
The music video for 2Pac's song "Keep Ya Head Up" says in the beginning that it is dedicated to Latasha Harlins.
German heavy metal band Accept wrote the song "Objection Overruled" in 1992, inspired by King's beating and the L.A. riots. The song criticizes the jury's decision to release the defendants.
Aerosmith's song "Livin' on the Edge" from their 1993 album Get a Grip was inspired by the riots.
Tori Amos' clip for the song "1000 Oceans" recreated scenes from the L.A. riots. The film clip was shot in L.A. and featured local actors who had lived through the riots.
The first verse of Bad Religion's song "Don't Pray on Me" (off their 1993 album Recipe for Hate) references the riots.
Black Label Society's music video for the song "Fire it Up" off their 2005 release Mafia used extensive riot footage, much of which was from the '92 L.A. incidents.
Body Count released, a month before the riots, the notorious song "Cop Killer", which was regarded by some as a precursor to the rioting.
David Bowie and his wife Iman had been looking to move to L.A. after getting married, but had the poor timing of landing in Los Angeles on the day the riots started. Bowie recorded a song ("Black Tie White Noise") based on the riots. Ultimately, Bowie and Iman settled in New York.
Bratmobile's song "Polaroid Baby", from their debut album Pottymouth, talks about the artificiality of white youths, burning down L.A., and making "whitey" pay, a reference to the riots which occurred as the album was being recorded.
Garth Brooks wrote "We Shall Be Free" while watching coverage of the riots, on TV.
The band Caroline's Spine released a song, called "Good Afternoon", on their 1994 album ...So Good Afternoon, which mentions the beatings by saying: "I think I'll try my look at Flo and Normanie and have some dude beat the living shit out of me".
Downset's song, "Anger", from their self-titled debut album was inspired by the riots. The cover of the album also features an image of South Central Los Angeles burning.
Dr. Dre's song, "The Day tha Niggaz Took Over", references the riots. Snoop Dogg and RBX also feature on the song, portraying their emotions as the riots started.
The Californian African American all-female group En Vogue released their anti-prejudice song "Free Your Mind" the year after the riots. It was a Billboard Hot 100 Top 10 hit for them.
Far East Movement's 2014 album, K-Town Riot, was inspired by the riot. The music video for the one of the tracks, The Illest, features footages from the riot.
Fear Factory's 1995 album, Demanufacture, was rehearsed and conceived in a particularly dangerous South Central neighborhood, right in the aftermath of the riots. In the remastered digipak edition of the album, it is explained that the tension and violence of riots were an inspiration to the album in general, from the aggressive music to the lyrical themes of corruption and revolt. Dino explains, "The owner had to write 'black-owned' on the front of the place, so people wouldn't destroy it. It wasn't exactly the best of areas to rehearse, but it definitely created a vibe."
Firehose's song "4. 29. 92", from the album Mr. Machinery Operator, contains sounds samples recorded on a specific day of the riots.
Ben Harper's "Like a King" off, the 1993 album Welcome to the Cruel World, is based on the treatment of Rodney King.
Ice Cube's song "We Had to Tear This Motherfucka Up" was written as a statement on the verdict and expressed sentiments similar to those of the rioters. Most of his 1992 release, The Predator, was inspired by the riots and Rodney King, with constant allusions to the incident throughout - the rap song Wicked made references to April 29, 1992. Ice Cube's song "Black Korea" on his 1991 album Death Certificate is a racist characterization of South Korean store owners. The song reflected the tensions between Korean Americans and African Americans following the Latasha Harlins shooting. A year later, during the riots, Koreans and Korean-owned stores were a major target of rioters. On Death Certificate, the Rodney King beating is mentioned, notably in a skit where a cop threatens a black man that he's going to "do you like Rodney King, Martin Luther King, and all the other goddamn Kings from Africa!"
In the rap song, "Natural Born Killaz" Ice Cube makes a Reginald Denny reference: "Fuck Charlie Manson, I'll snatch him out his truck, hit him with a brick and I'm dancin'."
Ice-T's song Race War from his 1993 solo album Home Invasion addressed the riots and the potential for further disturbances. Ice-T condemned the targeting of Korean-Americans during the riots. He wrote, "Korean people live down in the hood / a little mis-fucking-understood / Orientals were slaves too / Word, to this fucking red, white and blue".
Billy Idol's 1993 song, "Shock to the System", from the Cyberpunk album, was directly inspired by the riots, including such lyrics as "You could be king/or I could be king". The B-side to the single "Shock to the System", called Aftershock, picks up the same topic.
A lyric in the Lamb of God song "Forgotten (Lost Angels)", from their 2006 album Sacrament, says "'92 should've burnt this fucker down". The song itself is about the city of Los Angeles.
Kendrick Lamar's song "County Building Blues", from his 2012 album Good Kid, M.A.A.D City makes several references throughout verse two of the song.
Lucky People Center's song Rodney King from their 1993 album Welcome to Lucky People Center features samples of Rodney King, L.A Police, and President George Bush, all set to an Ambient/Trance rhythm.
The Machine Head album Burn My Eyes (1994) contains the song "Real Eyes, Realize, Real Lies", which features sampled commentary from news reports and interviews surrounding the riots.
In 1992, Branford Marsalis released the album I Heard You Twice the First Time, which featured a song called "Simi Valley Blues", a reference to the city in which the trial of the four police officers was conducted. Although the beating took place in Los Angeles, the trial was held in the more-conservative Simi Valley, California, a decision that is thought to have resulted in the acquittal of the officers.
One Minute Silence's song "Stuck Between a Rock and a White Face", from their album Available in All Colors, features the happenings of April 29.
The title track of Porno For Pyros' debut album, along with "Black Girlfriend", both make reference to the riots, which occurred prior to the album's production.
Rage Against the Machine's Zack de la Rocha rapped about the race riots in South Central LA in "Township Rebellion", from the band's eponymous debut album.
Rancid's song "I Wanna Riot" is based on the events.
Redman's skit "News Break" had an excerpt from the news that a reporter informing the numbers of deaths and injures and talking about what is going on in the riot from the 1992 album Whut? Thee Album.
Slayer and Ice-T collaborated on the song "Disorder", which appeared on the Judgment Night movie soundtrack. The song was a medley of three songs by the British punk rock band The Exploited. The song "UK '82" (which dealt with police brutality) was renamed "LA '92".
Bruce Springsteen released an alternate version of his single "57 Channels (And Nothin' On)" subtitled "Little Steven Dance Mix," which featured audio clips of news coverage of the L.A. riots along with chants of "No Justice, No Peace" and a variety of other audio clips representing the popular culture of the time, including President George H.W. Bush's ironic statement from the 1988 presidential campaign: "We want a kinder and gentler nation." Springsteen performed this version of the song on Saturday Night Live on May 9, 1992, his first public appearance with "the Other Band" that toured with him during 1992-93 in support of his albums Human Touch and Lucky Town.
Sublime's song, "April 29, 1992 (Miami)", is based on accounts of the riots. In the song Bradley Nowell (Lead singer of Sublime) tells of his part in the riot including robberies. He claims that it wasn't even about Rodney King for some people.
The Boo Radleys' 1993 album Giant Steps contains a song entitled "Rodney King (Song for Lenny Bruce)"
The Game mentions the riots on the song "Never can say Goodbye", off the album LAX, rapping: "They thought my group influenced the L.A Riots", from the perspective of Eazy-E speaking about N.W.A's being widely considered one of the seminal acts of the gangsta rap music subgenre. N.W.A. was made famous by the song "Fuck tha Police", which highlights many of the tensions between black urban youth and the police.
The Offspring's song "L.A.P.D." off the album Ignition is about the Rodney King incident.
"Rioting", by the San Diego-based band The Rugburns, was inspired by the riots.
Thurzday's debut album L.A. Riot was inspired by the events of the Rodney King beating and the Los Angeles Riots.
Tom Petty and the Heartbreakers rush-released a single entitled "Peace in L.A."

Television
(Alphabetical by series)
The NBC comedy 30 Rock did a spot where Liz Lemon was inadvertently in the middle of the Los Angeles riots on April 29, 1992 - asking for travel directions as rioters shook her car.
 In the 1992-1993 season premiere of the NBC sitcom A Different World, Dwayne and Whitley's Los Angeles honeymoon coincides with the riots. Rapper/activist Sister Souljah, Roseanne and Tom Arnold are among the guest stars. The show spun off from The Cosby Show, which aired its series finale during the riots and which has been cited as having stopped the turmoil. 
 In Beverly Hills, 90210 third-season episode, Home and Away, references are made to the Los Angeles riots. 
 In The CW's Arrow, Brick demands the police and city servicemen vacate The Glades, making reference to how they did in Los Angeles in 1992.
In the SBS Television series Athena: Goddess of War, Yoon Hye-in was orphaned at nine when her parents were killed during the riots, and she was saved by Korean-American teenager Son-hyuk, who later become her protector and mentor.
The fourth-season opener of the ABC sitcom Doogie Howser, MD was fully devoted to the 1992 riots in L.A.
The season 5 premiere of the sitcom George Lopez "George Gets A Pain In The Ash", Benny is about to leave to go retrieve possible leftovers from her house which had burned down, insisting she moves faster on her own, with her son George replying "That's what you said during the riots", referring to Rodney King (jokingly called "Robbie King" by Benny).
The third-season opener of the Fox comedy series In Living Color focused on the L.A. riots, and subsequent third-season episodes featured skits focusing on the L.A. riots (example: "The L.A. Riots Anniversary Special" promo).
The NBC drama L.A. Law seventh-season opener was set on the day of the riots.
Extensive coverage of the riots was featured on The Arsenio Hall Show. Mayor Tom Bradley appeared on the show and pleaded for calm to the residents of L.A.
The third season's episode #2 ("Grave Doubt") of The Closer, starring Kyra Sedgwick, dealt with the discovery of the body of a black man who was killed during the LA riots by another black man.
The Fresh Prince of Bel-Air episode "Will Gets Committed" saw Will Smith and the Banks family contributing to the post-riot clean-up and pondering its implications.
The HBO sitcom The Larry Sanders Show, which is set in L.A. around the time of the riots, makes frequent reference to the riots in the early seasons.
An episode from the second season of MTV's The Real World, which was filming in L.A. in 1992, shows some of the housemates out for a day of playing basketball. A portion of the police perimeter forms near them, and officers in riot gear advise the house-mates to evacuate the area as the riots begin.
The FX crime drama The Shield makes reference to the reputation of the LAPD following the Rodney King saga and the subsequent Los Angeles riots.
During the first episode of The Tonight Show with Jay Leno, Jay Leno made the following remark during the opening monologue: "Do we have some out-of-towners here tonight?" (pause for applause) "Let me be the first to welcome you to Los Angeles, or as President Bush calls it: Operation Desert Storm, the home game!" Several other jokes followed related to the riots and looting afterwards.

Theater
Stage actress Anna Deavere Smith created a play, Twilight: Los Angeles 1992, based on interviews with people about the riots.
The posthumous Bill Hicks album Arizona Bay includes a sequence of stand-up routines about the L.A. Riots, Reginald Denny, and the Rodney King trial. This routine is also featured on his UK albums: Salvation and Live at The Oxford Playhouse.
The spoken-word album Everything, by Henry Rollins, is a chapter out of his book Eye Scream, which contains accounts of Rollins' life in L.A. during the riots as well as his opinions of the cops and the residents' reactions.

Video games
The end missions in the game Grand Theft Auto: San Andreas revolve around the acquittal of two extremely corrupt police officers (Frank Tenpenny and Eddie Pulaski, both antagonists in the game) in 1992. Their acquittal causes riots throughout the city of Los Santos, which is modeled on Los Angeles.
In Earthbound after Ness beats the first boss in the game, when he is taken to a police station, and attacked one-by-one by four police officers and their captain. The scene in the game mirrors the 1991 beating of Rodney King in Los Angeles.
Blitz: The League II features a team called the LA Riot.
Stock footage from the 1992 Los Angeles riots was utilized for the opening of Resident Evil 3 to show how Raccoon City fell to the T-Virus outbreak.

References

Popular culture
United States in popular culture